Alberto Carlos Rosende (born February 14, 1993) is an American actor and singer, known for his role as Simon Lewis in the Freeform supernatural drama Shadowhunters from 2016 to 2019. In 2019, he began starring as Firefighter Candidate Blake Gallo in the NBC drama Chicago Fire.

Early life and education
Rosende was born and raised in South Florida, to Martha Cristina Ferrucho and Alberto Carlos Rosende. His father is a major-general in the U.S. Army Reserve and was named Commanding General of the 63rd Readiness Division located in Mountain View, California, in October 2019. He has a younger brother, Diego, who works in the film production industry. He is of Colombian and Cuban descent. Rosende attended Fort Lauderdale Children's Theater, where he appeared in a number of productions, including starring as Link Larkin in Hairspray. He attended St. Thomas Aquinas High School in Fort Lauderdale, where he was a member of STA Players, as Danny Zuko in Grease, Emile De Becque in South Pacific, and Dr. Lyman Sanderson in Harvey. In April 2013, Rosende was diagnosed with testicular cancer. In 2015, Rosende graduated from New York University's Tisch School of the Arts with a Bachelor of Fine Arts.

Career
Rosende's first professional acting credit was as a swing dancer in the 2013 short film The Swing of Things. In 2015, he guest-starred in the CBS police procedural drama Blue Bloods, in the fifth-season episode "Sins of the Father", as Carlos Santiago. That same year, he guest-starred in the NBC police procedural drama Law & Order: Special Victims Unit in the seventeenth-season episode "Catfishing Teacher" as Jordan Messina. On May 2, 2015, it was announced that Rosende had been cast as Simon Lewis in the Freeform supernatural drama Shadowhunters, based on Cassandra Clare's The Mortal Instruments book series, which ran from January 12, 2016, to May 6, 2019.

Personal life
Rosende is currently engaged to actress and former Shadowhunters costar Tessa Mossey.

Filmography

Awards and nominations

References

External links 

 
 

1993 births
21st-century American male actors
American people of Colombian descent
American people of Cuban descent
Hispanic and Latino American male actors
Living people
Male actors from Florida
New York University alumni
People from Florida
Rosende, Alberto